José Luis Sierra Cabrera (born 24 June 1997) is a Chilean footballer who plays for Chilean Primera División side Unión Española.

Club career
On 21 January 2020, he signed a two-year contract with Italian third-tier Serie C club Bisceglie.

On April 29, 2021, he joined Chilean Segunda División side Deportes Colina.

International career
He represented Chile U20 at two South American Youth Football Championships: 2015 in Uruguay and 2017 in Ecuador.

Personal life
He is the son of the former Chilean international footballer José Luis Sierra.

References

External links
 
 
 

1997 births
Footballers from Santiago
Living people
Chilean footballers
Chilean expatriate footballers
Chile under-20 international footballers
Association football forwards
Unión Española footballers
A.S. Bisceglie Calcio 1913 players
Deportes Temuco footballers
Deportes Colina footballers
Chilean Primera División players
Serie C players
Primera B de Chile players
Segunda División Profesional de Chile players
Chilean expatriate sportspeople in Italy
Expatriate footballers in Italy